Cicujano is a town located in the municipality of Arraia-Maeztu in the province of Álava (Araba), in the autonomous community of Basque Country, northern Spain.

External links
 CICUJANO in the Bernardo Estornés Lasa - Auñamendi Encyclopedia (Euskomedia Fundazioa) 

Populated places in Álava